Betl may refer to:

 Betl (cards), a contract equivalent to misère in certain European card games
 Bangalore Elevated Tollways Ltd, a company responsible for the Hosur Road elevated expressway in India
 A C++ software library; see Boundary element method